Federal Route 189 (formerly Kelantan State Route D11, D7 and Terengganu State Route T7) is a federal road in Kelantan, Malaysia. It is also a main route to the Royal Malaysian Air Force (RMAF) Gong Kedak Air Force Base.

Features

At most sections, the Federal Route 189 was built under the JKR R5 road standard, allowing maximum speed limit of up to 90 km/h.

List of junctions and towns

References

Malaysian Federal Roads